The Men's Team Class 3 table tennis competition at the 2008 Summer Paralympics was held between 13 September and 16 September at the Peking University Gymnasium. Classes 6–10 were for athletes with a physical impairment who competed from a standing position; the lower the number, the greater the impact the impairment had on an athlete's ability to compete.

The competition was a straight knock-out format. Each tie was decided by the best of a potential five matches, two singles, a doubles (not necessarily the same players) and two reverse singles.

The event was won by the team representing .

Competition bracket

Quarter-finals

Semi-finals

Finals

Gold medal match

Bronze medal match

Team Lists

References

Table tennis at the 2008 Summer Paralympics